Spring Waltz is the name of a soundtrack in 2006 for the KBS drama Spring Waltz.

Track listing

Spring Waltz O.S.T

 Teardrop Waltz
 One Love - Loveholic (러브홀릭)
 Childhood 
 Cannonball - Damien Rice
 Clementine - Lee Ji-soo (이지수)
 Flower - U-NA (유나)
 봄의 왈츠 (Spring Waltz)
 내 인생의 봄날 - S.Jin (에스진)
 A Sad Memory - Jang Se-yong (장세용)
 이젠 사랑할 수 있어요 (I Can Love Now) - Yurisangja (유리상자)
 Shadow Waltz - Jang Se-yong (장세용)
 무지개 (Rainbow) - Bada
 Song of Island - Lee Ji-soo (이지수)
 수호천사 (Guardian Angel) - S.Jin (에스진)
 Flashback
 마음으로 부르는 노래 (A Song Calling to My Heart) - Myung In-hee (명인희)
 Tears for Remembrance

Spring Waltz - Love Poem by Lee Ji Soo

 Love Poem
 Flying Petals
 Nocturns For Clementine
 꿈속에서
 Love Poem (Piano Solo)
 꿈속에서 (Piano Solo)
 Flying Petals (Piano Duet)

Spring Waltz Disc 1 By Yoon Jae Ha

 Spring Waltz - 봄의 왈츠 (Piano version) - 이루마 (Yiruma)
 Day Dream - 박종훈 (Park Jong Hoon)
 Sunday Afternoon Waltz - 박종훈 (Park Jong Hoon)
 Dreaming Island's Story (Piano version) - 섬의 이야기 - 이루마 (Yiruma) 
 Lost in Island - 잃어버린 섬 (Piano version) - 이루마 (Yiruma)
 A Sad Motive - 박종훈 (Park Jong Hoon)
 Vivace - Broken Blossoms - 이루마 (Yiruma)
 Clementine - To My Little Girl I - 이루마 (Yiruma)
 I Think You Love Me - 박종훈 (Park Jong Hoon)
 Before Stars Sleeping - 별이 지기 전에 - 이루마 (Yiruma)
 Dreaming Island's Story (Clarinet solo) - 이루마 (Yiruma feat. Clarinet soloist Hee Jeong Lucia Kye)
 Autumn-Colored Spring (Guitar solo) - 가을을 닮은 봄 I - 이루마 (Yiruma feat. Guitar soloist Kim Min Seok)
 Men's Tears (Cello solo) - 박종훈 (Park Jong Hoon feat. Cello soloist Heo Yoon Jung)
 Autumn-Colored Spring (Guitar & Piano solo) - 가을을 닮은 봄 II - 이루마 (Yiruma)
 Lost in Island (String version) - 잃어버린 섬 - 이루마 (Yiruma feat. Celloist Heo Yoon Jung) 
 Silence - 박종훈 (Park Jong Hoon)
 너의 뒷모습 - 박종훈 (Park Jong Hoon)
 Clementine - To My Little Girl II - 이루마 (Yiruma) 
 Guten Morgen - 박종훈 (Park Jong Hoon)
 Spring Waltz (H.I.S. String version) - 이루마 (Yiruma feat. Clarinet player Hee Jeong Lucia Kye) 
 Clementine - To My Little Girl III (Bonus Track) - 이루마 (Yiruma) 
 Lost in Island (Free version) - 잃어버린 섬 (Bonus Track) - 이루마 (Yiruma) 

Spring Waltz Disc 2 By Yoon Jae Ha

 Chopin Nocturne in C # minor (쇼팽 녹턴 C#단조)
 Schumann Humoreske (슈만 유모레스크 도입부)
 Chopin Waltz in B minor (쇼팽 왈츠 B단조)
 Chopin Prelude in E minor, Op.28-4 (쇼팽 프렐류드 E단조 작품 28-4)
 Chopin Etude in E major, op.10-3 (쇼팽 에튀드 E장조 작품 10-3) - 이별의 노래
 Tchaikovsky 'Autumn Song' (차이콥스키 '가을의 노래')
 Chopin Nocturne in E♭major, op.9-2 (쇼팽 녹턴 E♭장조 작품 9-2)
 Chopin Etude in E♭minor, op.10-6 (쇼팽 에튀드 E♭단조 작품 10-6)
 Chopin Prelude in D♭Major, op.28-15 (쇼팽 프렐류드 D♭장조 작품 28-15) - 빗방울
 Tchaikovsky Nocturne in C# minor (차이콥스키 녹턴 C# 단조)

External links
  KBS' Official Site

Soundtracks by South Korean artists
2006 soundtrack albums
Television soundtracks
Kakao M soundtracks